James Willis Cash (January 17, 1941 – March 25, 2000) was an American film writer, noted for writing such 1980s films as Top Gun and The Secret of My Success.

Early life
Cash was born on January 17, 1941, in Boyne City, Michigan.

Education
In 1970, Cash received a B.A. in English from Michigan State University (MSU). In 1972, Cash received an M.A. in Television and Radio from Michigan State University.

Career
As a professor, Cash taught writing and film history at Michigan State University. Cash met a student named Jack Epps, Jr., who would later become his writing partner. Epps was from the Detroit area.

Cash and Epps began their writing relationship while at Michigan State University. In 1975, they wrote their first story together in the MSU Union Grill. Soon afterward Epps moved to Hollywood, California. Cash continued to live in East Lansing, Michigan, while Epps lived in Santa Monica, California. They collaborated via computer.

In 1986, Cash and Epps co-wrote Top Gun.

Personal life
Cash married his first wife, Mariann (Mimi), when he was a professor at MSU and she was a sophomore at MSU studying communications.

Cash and his second wife, Cynthia, had four children. He and his wife had a restaurant in Lansing, Michigan.

Cash also established several scholarships for film production and performing arts.

He died after hospitalization for an intestinal ailment.

Filmography
 Dangerously (with Jack Epps Jr.) (1978) (unproduced)
 Izzy and Moe (with Jack Epps Jr., Steven Patrick Bell and Robert Boris) (1985) (TV) (story only)
 Top Gun (with Jack Epps Jr.) (1986)
 Legal Eagles (with Jack Epps Jr.) (1986)
 The Secret of My Success (with Jack Epps Jr. and A.J. Carothers) (1987)
 Turner & Hooch (with Jack Epps Jr., Dennis Shryack, Michael Blodgett and Daniel Petrie Jr.) (1989)
 Dick Tracy (with Jack Epps Jr.) (1990)
 Anaconda (with Jack Epps Jr. and Hans Bauer) (1997)
 The Flintstones in Viva Rock Vegas (with Jack Epps Jr.) (2000)
 Anacondas: The Hunt for the Blood Orchid (with Jack Epps Jr. and Hans Bauer) (2004) (story, elements from the original Anaconda script)
 Top Gun: Maverick (based on characters created by with Jack Epps Jr.) (2022) (story only) (screenplay from the film Top Gun)

References

External links
 

1941 births
2000 deaths
People from Boyne City, Michigan
American male screenwriters
Michigan State University alumni
Screenwriting instructors
Screenwriters from Michigan
20th-century American male writers
20th-century American screenwriters
Deaths from digestive disease